William McElroy may refer to:

 William D. McElroy (1917–1999), American biochemist and academic administrator
 William S. McEllroy (1893–1981), tennis player